Pristigenys niphonia, the Japanese bigeye, is a species of marine ray-finned fish in the family Priacanthidae. It occurs in the western Pacific Ocean.

Distribution
The Japanese bigeye is found in the western Pacific. Specifically, it is found in the marine waters around: Japan, the East China Sea Shelf, Taiwan, South China Sea, Vietnam, Celebes, Australia, and Indonesia.

References

 EOL.org
 Iwatsuki, Y., T. Matsuda, W.C. Starnes, T. Nakabo and T. Yoshino. (2012). "A valid priacanthid species, Pristigenys refulgens (Valenciennes 1862), and a redescription of P. niphonia (Cuvier in Cuvier & Valenciennes 1829) in the Indo-West Pacific (Perciformes: Priacanthidae)". Zootaxa 3206:41-57.
 Starnes, W.C. (1988). "Revision, phylogeny and biogeographic comments on the circumtropical marine percoid fish family Priacanthidae." Bull. Mar. Sci. 43(2):117-203.

niphonia
Fish described in 1829
Taxa named by Georges Cuvier